The Meppel–Groningen railway is an important railway line in the Netherlands running from Meppel to Groningen, passing through Hoogeveen, Beilen and Assen. The line was opened in 1870. It is also known as the Staatslijn "C".

Stations
The main interchange stations on the Meppel–Groningen railway are:

Meppel: to Utrecht, Zwolle and Leeuwarden
Groningen: to Leeuwarden, Delfzijl and Nieuweschans

History
The Westerbork transit camp, where Dutch Jews and others were held before deportation to Nazi concentration camps in the East, had its own branch line from the Meppel–Groningen railway, branching off at the former Hooghalen railway station. In the 1970s, the railway was the scene of two train hijackings by South-Moluccans: in 1975 at Wijster, and in 1977 at De Punt.

Railway lines in Groningen (province)
Railway lines in the Netherlands
Railway lines in Drenthe